John Baptist Yi Kwang-nyol (c. 1800 – July 20, 1839) was one of the 103 Korean Martyrs. His feast day is July 20, and he is also venerated along with the rest of The Korean martyrs on September 20.

John embraced Roman Catholicism with his elder brother when he was 28 years old. His fervor attracted the attention of the catechists, who sent him to Beijing to negotiate affairs of religion. The priests of the capital, in admiration of his piety, conferred upon him baptism and the other sacraments. John Baptist, after his return to his country, abstained from eating meat throughout the rest of his life, and made a resolution to live in celibacy. He was noted for his holy exterior appearance. He was martyred at the age of 39, severely tortured with torturing instruments and at last beheaded with an axe.

References

Bibliography 
 The Lives of the 103 Martyr Saints of Korea: Saint John Baptist Yi Kwang-nyol (1795~1839) , Catholic Bishops' Conference of Korea Newsletter No. 56 (Fall 2006).

1800 births
1839 deaths
19th-century Christian saints
19th-century executions by Korea
19th-century Roman Catholic martyrs
Converts to Roman Catholicism
Executed Korean people
Korean Roman Catholic saints
People executed by Korea by decapitation
Christian martyrs executed by decapitation
Catholic martyrs
Canonizations by Pope John Paul II
Joseon Christians